Bumthang District (Dzongkha: བུམ་ཐང་རྫོང་ཁག་; Wylie: Bum-thang rzong-khag) is one of the 20 dzongkhag (districts) comprising Bhutan. It is the most historic dzongkhag if the number of ancient temples and sacred sites is counted. Bumthang consists of the four mountain valleys of Ura, Chumey, Tang and Choekhor ("Bumthang"), although occasionally the entire district is referred to as Bumthang Valley.

Bumthang directly translates as "beautiful field" – thang means field or flat place, and bum is said be an abbreviation of either bumpa (a vessel for holy water, thus describing the shape and nature of the valley), or simply bum ("girl," indicating this is the valley of beautiful girls). The name is said to have arisen after the construction of Jambay Lhakhang.

Economy

Bumthang farms yield buckwheat, dairy products, honey, apples, potato, rice, woolen products and many other products. Bumthang is rich in producing wheat, buckwheat, dairy products, and potatoes. Bumthang is also nationally famous for yatha and bumthna matha weaving.

Languages
East Bodish languages are primarily spoken in Bumthang District.

The language spoken in the Bumthang district is known as Bumthangkha. It is a Tibeto-Burman language mutually intelligible with Khengkha and closely related to Dzongkha, the national language of Bhutan. Bumthangkha is partially comprehensible to speakers of Dzongkha, which originated in valleys to the west of Bumthang.  Each of the four valleys of Bumthang has its own dialect, and the remnants of the Kheng kingdom, near and in Zhemgang District to the south, speak Khengkha. Historically, Bhumthangkha and its speakers have had close contact with speakers of Kurtöpkha to the east, Nupbikha to the west, and Khengkha to the south, to the extent that they may be considered part of a wider collection of "Bumthang languages."

Brokkat, an endangered Southern Bodish language, is spoken by about 300 people in the village of Dhur in Bumthang Valley. The language is a remnant of pastoral yakherd communities.

Administrative divisions
Bumthang District is divided into four village blocks (or gewogs):

Chhume Gewog
Choekor Gewog
Tang Gewog
Ura Gewog

Bumthang also contains several notable towns:
Chhumey
Prakhar
Jakar - the district administrative headquarters
Tang Valley
Ura

Annual Jakar Tshechus:
Mid October (every year)

Tandindang school was started on 17 July 2010, to benefit the children going to school.

Environment
Most of Bumthang District is part of Bhutan's extensive protected areas network. The northern two-thirds of the district (the gewogs of Chhoekhor and Tang) belong to Wangchuck Centennial Park, buffered by pockets of biological corridors. Southern Bumthang (the gewogs of Chhumig, Tang and Ura) is part of another protected area, Thrumshingla National Park.
Bumthang is known for its important population of black-necked cranes migrating in winter.

Landmarks
Membartsho (Burning Lake), where sacred scriptures were hidden by Padmasambhava in the 8th century and later recovered by Pema Lingpa in the 15th century.
Kurjey Lhakhang, the final resting place of the remains of the first three Kings of Bhutan.
Jakar Dzong, adjacent to the main town of Jakar.
Jambay Lhakhang, one of the two most ancient temples of Bhutan, built in the 7th century by Songtsän Gampo, founder of the Tibetan Empire.
Tamzhing Monastery, the most important Nyingma institution in the country.
Padtshaling Gonpa,  The monastery was established by the first Padtshaling Tulku Siddha  Namgyal Lhendub in 1769, according to the prophecy of Lhasa Jowo.

See also
Districts of Bhutan
Bumthang Province
Nangnang, Bhutan
Thrumshing La

References

External links

Bumthang Dzongkhag official website
Five year plan 2002-2007

 
Districts of Bhutan